The Churches Conservation Trust is a registered charity whose purpose is to protect historic churches at risk in England. The charity cares for over 350 churches of architectural, cultural and historic significance, which have been transferred into its care by the Church of England.

The Trust works to prevent any deterioration in the condition of the buildings in its care and to ensure they are in use as community assets.  Local communities are encouraged to use them for activities and events and the buildings provide an educational resource, allowing children and young people to study history, architecture and other subjects.

Most of the churches saved from closure are Grade I or Grade II* listed. Many are open to visitors as heritage sites on a daily basis and nearly 2 million people visit the Trust's churches each year. The majority of the churches remain consecrated, though they are not used for regular worship.

History
The trust was established by the Pastoral Measure of 1969 under its original name, the Redundant Churches Fund. The legally defined object of the trust is "the preservation, in the interests of the nation and the Church of England, of churches and parts of churches of historic and archaeological interest or architectural quality vested in the Fund ... together with their contents so vested". 

The new charity's first project was the Grade I listed Medieval St Peter's Parish Church at Edlington in South Yorkshire, in 1971. It was virtually in ruins and was extensively restored. By 1979, the trust was caring for 147 churches, increasing to over 250 by 2000, and eventually to 350.

Relationship to Friends of Friendless Churches 
An earlier charity with similar goals, the Friends of Friendless Churches, was founded in 1957 by Ivor Bulmer-Thomas, and their campaigning contributed to the establishment of the Redundant Churches Fund. Many of the churches cared for by the Friends were transferred to the new body, and Bulmer-Thomas became its first chairman. However, the decision to preserve a church lay with the Church Commissioners, and to prevent the demolition of others the Friends changed their constitution to enable them to take ownership of churches. The Friends continue in this role in England, and in Wales (which is outside the scope of the Trust) the Friends are the equivalent of the Trust.

Structure 
The charity is run by a board of trustees, nine individuals, who delegate the day-to-day management to a chief executive and the senior management team which includes five directors. Since 2017, the chief executive has been Peter Aiers. The central office of The Churches Conservation Trust is at Society Building, 8 All Saints Street, London, N1 9RL.

Finances
The trust is financed partly by the Department for Culture, Media and Sport and the Church Commissioners, but grants from those bodies were frozen in 2001, since when additional funding has come from other sources, including sponsors and the general public. During the 2016-2017 period, the trust's income was £9,184,283 and expenditures totalled £9,189,061. The income was down 18% down from the previous period because of the "reduced value of legacies and HLF Grants".

The trust's sponsors include the agencies listed above, while the patrons are Stephen Dawson, Tom Peers, Debbie Dance MSc MRICS FRSA, Christopher Knight and Janet Townsend-Stojic. The chief donors are Ned & Neva Asplundh, Michael Fowle, Timothy Ingram Hill and Richard Taylor.

During 2016–2017, 92% of the expenditures went to front-line projects, with 65% of that spent on church repairs and maintenance. Most of the balance was spent on efforts to keep churches open by increased tourism, volunteering and partnership programmes. During that year it had 64 employees, and received the support of up to 2,000 volunteers.

Lists of churches maintained

Northern England
List of churches preserved by The Churches Conservation Trust in Northern England
This list contains the churches in the counties of Cheshire, Cumbria, Greater Manchester, Lancashire, Merseyside, Northumberland, Tyne and Wear and Yorkshire.

East of England
List of churches preserved by The Churches Conservation Trust in the East of England
This list contains the churches in the counties of Bedfordshire, Cambridgeshire, Essex, Hertfordshire, Lincolnshire, Norfolk, and Suffolk.

English Midlands
List of churches preserved by The Churches Conservation Trust in the English Midlands
This list contains the churches in the counties of Derbyshire, Gloucestershire, Herefordshire, Leicestershire, Northamptonshire, Nottinghamshire, Rutland, Shropshire, Staffordshire,  Warwickshire and Worcestershire.

South East England
List of churches preserved by The Churches Conservation Trust in Southeast England
This list contains the churches in the counties of Berkshire,  Buckinghamshire, East Sussex, Greater London, Hampshire, Kent, Oxfordshire, Surrey and West Sussex.

South West England
List of churches preserved by The Churches Conservation Trust in South West England
This list contains the churches in Bristol, Cornwall, Devon, Dorset, Somerset and Wiltshire.

Camping 

The Churches Conservation Trust organise camping in churches (or "champing") for the churches in their care to provide accommodation for campers as a form of fund-raising.

References

External links
 

Church of England societies and organisations
Department for Digital, Culture, Media and Sport
Heritage organisations in England
Organisations based in the London Borough of Islington
Religion in the London Borough of Islington